Ivan Kružliak (born 24 March 1984 ) is a Slovak football referee. He refereed at 2012–13 UEFA Europa League. He also refereed in the Wembley 2014 FIFA World Cup Qualifier between England and Moldova. The game was a 4-0 victory for the home side.

See also
List of football referees

References 

1984 births
Living people
Slovak football referees
UEFA Europa League referees